Edward Jeffrey Irving Ardizzone,  (16 October 1900 – 8 November 1979), who sometimes signed his work "DIZ", was an English painter, print-maker and war artist, and the author and illustrator of books, many of them for children. For Tim All Alone (Oxford, 1956), which he wrote and illustrated, Ardizzone won the inaugural Kate Greenaway Medal from the Library Association for the year's best children's book illustration by a British subject. For the 50th anniversary of the Medal in 2005, the book was named one of the top ten winning titles, selected by a panel to compose the ballot for public election of an all-time favourite.

Early life
Ardizzone's father, Auguste Ardizzone, was a naturalised Frenchman of Italian descent, who was born a Pied-Noir in French Algeria, then a colony of France, and worked on overseas government service elsewhere in the French colonial empire. Ardizzone's mother, Margaret, was English. Her father, Edward Alexander Irving, was assistant Colonial Secretary, Straits Settlements, in what is now known as Singapore. Edward Ardizzone was born in the port city of Haiphong, then known as Tonkin, in the north of French Indo-China, a city now in Vietnam, while his father was working for the Eastern Extension Telegraph Company.

In 1905 Margaret Ardizzone returned to England with her three eldest children. They were brought up in Suffolk, largely by their maternal grandmother, while Margaret returned to join her husband in the Far East. The Ardizzone family lived in Corder Road, Ipswich, between 1905 and 1910, and then in Gainsborough Road from 1911 to 1912. Ardizzone was educated first at Ipswich School and then, from 1912, at Clayesmore School, a boarding school in Dorset. At Clayesmore his interest in drawing was encouraged by an art teacher.

Early career
Ardizzone left school in 1918 and twice tried to enlist in the British Army but was refused. After spending six months at a commerce college in Bath, Ardizzone spent several years working as an office clerk in both Warminster and London, where he began taking evening classes at the Westminster School of Art, which were taught by Bernard Meninsky. In 1922 Ardizzone became a naturalised British citizen. While working as an office clerk, Ardizzone had spent his weekends and free time painting and in 1926, with financial support from his father, gave up his office job to concentrate on establishing himself as a professional, freelance artist.

Ardizzone's first major commission was to illustrate an edition of In a Glass Darkly by Sheridan Le Fanu in 1929. He also produced advertising material for Johnnie Walker whisky, and illustrations for both Punch and The Radio Times, including the 1937 and 1948 Christmas covers of the latter. The first book by Ardizzone listed by the US Library of Congress is The Mediterranean: An Anthology (London: Cassell, 1935, OCLC 2891569), compiled by Paul Bloomfield, "decorated by Edward Ardizzone" with "each chapter preceded by illustrated half-title". In 1936 he inaugurated his best-known work, the Tim series of books, featuring the maritime adventures of its eponymous young hero, which he both wrote and illustrated. Little Tim and the Brave Sea Captain was published by Oxford University Press in both London and New York that year. In 1939 he illustrated the first of a series of four Mimff children's books by H.J.Kaesar.

By 1939 Ardizzone was regularly holding one-man exhibitions at the Bloomsbury Gallery and, later, the Leger Gallery. At this time the major theme of his paintings was life in London, with affectionate illustrations of the pubs and parks near his home in Maida Vale. His style was naturalistic but subdued, featuring gentle lines and delicate watercolours, with great attention to particular details.

Second World War

In the Second World War, after a short spell serving in an anti-aircraft unit, Ardizzone was assigned to the War Office by the War Artists' Advisory Committee and posted overseas as a full-time official war artist. He first served with the British Expeditionary Force and depicted its retreat through France and Belgium before it was evacuated back to Britain from Boulogne in May 1940. In Britain, he recorded troops at their training camps and spent nights sketching in the London Underground, where tube tunnels were being used as air-raid shelters during the Blitz. Ardizzone spent the early part of 1941 travelling around Scotland. In January 1942 he recorded the arrival of American troops in Northern Ireland. In March of that year he went to Cairo and joined the British First Army on its march to Tunisia, and then joined the Eighth Army. By July 1943 Ardizzone was in Sicily, where he witnessed combat at close quarters, and unusually for him, painted the aftermath of the fighting. He travelled on through Italy with the Eighth Army until April 1944, when he flew to Algiers, from where he sailed back to Britain. In June 1944 he went to France during the Allied invasion, but by September 1944 was back in Italy. He again travelled widely there and witnessed the fall of Reggio Calabria and Naples. He spent the winter of 1944 in Italy before travelling to Germany for the final months of the War. By the time Ardizzone returned to England in May 1945 he had completed almost 400 sketches and watercolours of the War, most of which, along with his wartime diaries, are held at the Imperial War Museum. His early experiences between Arras and Boulogne are illustrated and described in his book Baggage to the Enemy (London 1941), while Diary of a War Artist, published in 1974, described his later experiences during the conflict.

Post-war career
After the War, Ardizzone resumed his freelance career and received commissions from The Strand Magazine for cover artwork, from the Ealing film studios for promotional material and from the Guinness company for adverts. Ardizzone was commissioned to produce a watercolour portrait of Winston Churchill and continued to write and illustrate books. The most famous Tim book is the inaugural Greenaway Medal-winner, Tim All Alone (Oxford, 1956). The series continued until 1972 with Tim's Last Voyage which was followed in 1977 by Ship's Cook Ginger.

Beside writing and illustrating his own books, Ardizzone also illustrated books written by others, including some editions of Anthony Trollope and H. E. Bates's My Uncle Silas. He illustrated the C. Day Lewis children's novel, The Otterbury Incident (1948). One of his happiest collaborations was that with Eleanor Farjeon, especially on The Little Bookroom (Oxford, 1955 collection). Ardizzone illustrated some novels by the American author Eleanor Estes, including Pinky Pye, The Witch Family, The Alley, Miranda the Great, and The Tunnel of Hugsy Goode (1958 to 1972). In 1962 he illustrated an edition of J. M. Barrie's Peter Pan, retold by Eleanor Graham, and A Ring of Bells (1962), John Betjeman's abridged version for children of his autobiographical poem Summoned by Bells (1960).

For illustrating Titus in Trouble, written by James Reeves, Ardizzone was a commended runner-up for the 1959 Greenaway Medal.
Ardizzone is particularly noted for having not just illustrated the covers and contents of books, but inked in the title text and author's name in his own hand, giving the books a distinctive look on shelves. An example is Clive King's Stig of the Dump from 1963. The Nurse Matilda series of children's books (1964–74) was written by his cousin Christianna Brand, who was seven years younger. Their shared grandmother had told the stories to both cousins and she had learned them from her father.

Early in the 1970s, Ardizzone illustrated a new edition of the 20-year-old Little books by Graham Greene: The Little Train, The Little Fire Engine, The Little Horse Bus, and The Little Steamroller. He also illustrated a re-telling of the Don Quixote story for children by James Reeves and his illustrations for The Land of Green Ginger by Noel Langley are regarded as classics in their own right. His 1970 autobiography, The Young Ardizzone - an autobiographical fragment, was illustrated with his own drawings.

Ardizzone also illustrated several telegrams for the Post Office in the 1950s and 1960s, many of which are considered collectors' items. He also held a number of teaching posts, working part-time as an instructor in graphic design at Camberwell School of Art and as a visiting tutor at the Royal College of Art. In 1960 he retired from his teaching posts and began spending more time at Rodmersham Green in Kent before moving there permanently in 1972. In 1929, Ardizzone had married Catherine Josephine Berkley Anderson (1904-1992) and the couple had two sons and a daughter. Ardizzone died of a heart attack in 1979 at his home in Rodmersham Green. After Catherine's death in 1992, the British government accepted 64 of Ardizzone's sketchbooks in lieu of inheritance tax and these are now held by the Ashmolean Museum in Oxford. The British Library published an illustrated bibliography of his works in 2003. A blue plaque unveiled in 2007 commemorates Ardizzone's home at 130 Elgin Avenue in Maida Vale.

Selected works

Books written and illustrated by Ardizzone

Little Tim and the Brave Sea Captain (1936)
Lucy Brown and Mr Grimes (1937)
Tim and Lucy Go to Sea (1938)
Baggage to the Enemy (1941)
Nicholas and the Fast-Moving Diesel (1947)
Paul, the Hero of the Fire (1948)
Tim to the Rescue (1949)
Tim and Charlotte (1951)
Tim in Danger (1953)
Tim All Alone (1956) - Kate Greenaway Medal winner, 1956
Johnny the Clockmaker (1960)
Tim's Friend Towser (1962)
Peter the Wanderer (1963)
Diana and her Rhinoceros (1964)
Tim and Ginger (1965)
Sarah and Simon and No Red Paint (1966)
The Little Girl and the Tiny Doll (with Aingelda Ardizzone) (1966)
Tim to the Lighthouse (1968)
The Young Ardizzone - An Autobiographical Fragment (1970)
The Wrong Side of the Bed (1970)
Johnny's Bad Day (1970)
Tim's Last Voyage (1972)
The Old Ballad of the Babes in the Wood (1972)
Diary of a War Artist (1974)
Ship's Cook Ginger (1977)
Indian Diary (1984)

Books by others, illustrated by Ardizzone 
In a Glass Darkly, (1929), by Sheridan Le Fanu
The Library, (1930), by George Crabbe
A Mediterranean Anthology, (1935), by Paul Bloomfield
Tom, Dick, and Harriet, (1937), by Neil Lyons
My Uncle Silas, (1939), by H E Bates
The Local, (1939), by Maurice Gorham
Great Expectations, (1939), by Charles Dickens
Mimff, (1939), by H. J. Kaeser
The Battle of France, (1940), by Andre Maurois, translated by F.R. Ludman
The Road to Bordeaux, (1941), by Dennis Freeman and Douglas Cooper
Peacock Pie: A Book of Rhymes, (1946), by Walter de la Mare
Poems of François Villon, (1946), translated by H. B. McCaskie
The Pilgrim's Progress, (1947), by John Bunyan
Hey Nonny Yes: passons and conceits from Shakespeare, (1947), by Hallam Fordham
Three Brothers and a Lady, (1947), by Margaret Black
Desbarollda, The Waltzing Mouse, (1947), by Noel Langley
Charles Dickens' Birthday Book, (1948), by Enid Dickens-Hawksley
The Otterbury Incident, (1948), by Cecil Day-Lewis
Jubilee Book, (1948), by Leonard Daniels
Back to the Local, (1949), by Maurice Gorham
Mimff in Charge, (1949) by H.J.Kaeser
Showmen and Suckers, (1951), by Maurice Gorham
Londoners, (1951), by Maurice Gorham
The Blackbird in the Lilac, (1952), by James Reeves
The Warden, (1952), by Anthony Trollope
Barchester Towers, (1952), by Anthony Trollope
Mimff Takes Over, (1954), by H.J.Kaeser
The Newcomes, (1954), by William Thackeray, edited by Arthur Pendennis, introduction by Angela Thirkell
The Fantastic Tale of the Plucky Sailor and the Postage Stamp, (1954), by Stephen Corrin
David Copperfield, (1954), by Charles Dickens
Bleak House, (1954), by Charles Dickens
The Little Bookroom, (1955), by Eleanor Farjeon
The Suburban Child, (1955), by James Kenward
Pictures on the Pavement, (1955), by George Walter Stonier
Minnow on the Say, (1955), by Philippa Pearce
Sun Slower Sun Faster, (1955) by Meriol Trevor
A Stickful of Nonpareil, (1956), by George Scurfield
Hunting with Mr. Jorrooks from Handley Cross, (1956), by Robert Smith Surtees
Pigeons and Princesses, (1956), by James Reeves
The Wandering Moon, (1956), by James Reeves
Henry Esmond, (1956), by William Makepeace Thackeray
St. Luke's Gospel, (1956)
Ding Dong Bell, (1957), by Percy Young
Lottie, (1957), by John Symonds
Prefabulous Animiles, (1957), by James Reeves
Sugar for the Horse, (1957), by H. E. Bates
The School in Our Village, (1957), by Joan Goldman
Pinky Pye, (1958), by Eleanor Estes
Jim at the Corner, (1958), by Eleanor Farjeon
The Story of Joseph, (1958), by Walter de la Mare
Mimff Robinson, (1958), by H.J.Kaeser
Shakespeare's Comedies, (1958)
Brief to Counsel, (1958), by Henry Cecil
Holiday Trench, (1959), by Joan Ballantyne
The Godstone and the Blackymor, (1959), by Terence Hanbury White
Titus in Trouble, (1959), by James Reeves
The Adventures of Don Quixote, (1959), retold by James Reeves
Elfrida and the Pig, (1959), by John Symonds
The Nine Lives of Island MacKenzie, (1959), by Ursula Moray-Williams
The Story of Moses, (1959), by Walter de la Mare
The Adventures of Father Brown, (1959), by G. K. Chesterton
The Rib of the Green Umbrella, (1960), by Naomi Mitchison
Boyhood of the Great Composers, (1960), by Catherine Gough
The Story of Samuel and Saul, (1960), by Walter de la Mare
Stories from the Bible, (1960), by Walter de la Mare
Kidnappers at Coombe, (1960), by Joan Ballantyne
Italian Peepshow, (1960), by Eleanor Farjeon
A Penny Fiddle, (1960), by Robert Graves
The Witch Family, (1960), by Eleanor Estes
Merry England, (1960), by Cyril Ray
Tom Sawyer, (1961), by Mark Twain
Huckleberry Finn, (1961), by Mark Twain
Down in the Cellar, (1961), Nicholas Stuart Grey
Folk Songs of England, Ireland, Scotland and Wales, (1961), by William Cole
Sailor Rumblelow and Britannia, (1962), by James Reeves
Mrs. Malone, (1962), by Eleanor Farjeon
Let's Make an Opera, (1962), by Eric Crozier
Peter Pan, (1962), retold by Eleanor Graham
The Singing Cupboard, (1962), by Dana Faralla
A Ring of Bells, (1962), by John Betjeman
Naughty Children: An Anthology, (1962), compiled by Christianna Brand
Kaleidoscope, (1963), by Eleanor Farjeon
Boyhood of the Great Composers Book II, (1963), by Catherine Gough
Hurdy Gurdy, (1963), by James Reeves
Wine List Decorations, (1963), by John Harvey & Sons, further illustrations by David Gentleman, Asgeir Scott and Shelia Waters
J.M Barrie's Peter Pan: the story of the Play, (1963), by Eleanor Graham
Stig of the Dump, (1963), by Clive King
Nurse Matilda, (1964), by Christianna Brand
Hello Elephant, (1964), by Jan Wahl
Swanhilda-of-the-Swans, (1964), by Dana Faralla
Thirty-Nine Steps, (1964), by John Buchan
The Land of Up and Down, (1964), by Eva-Lis Wuorio
Three Tall Tales, (1964), by James Reeves
The Island of Fish in the Trees, (1964), by Eva-Lis Wuorio
Ann at Highwood Hall: Poems for Children, (1964), by Robert Graves
The Alley, (1964), by Eleanor Estes
Old Perisher, (1964), by Diana Ross
Timothy's Song, (1965), by William J Lederer
The Truants, (1965), by John Walsh
The Year Round, (1965), by Leonard Clark
The Milldale Riot, (1965), by Freda Nicholls
Know About the Law, (1965), by Henry Cecil
The Old Nurse's Stocking Basket, (1965), by Eleanor Farjeon
The Story of Jackie Thimble, (1965), by James Reeves
The Land of Green Ginger, (1966), by Noel Langley
The Dragon, (1966), by Archibald Marshall
The Muffletumps, (1966), by Jan Wahl
Long Ago When I was Young, (1966), by E. Nesbit
The Eleanor Farjeon book: a tribute to her life and work 1881-1965, (1966), introduction by Naomi Lewis
The Growing Summer, (1966), by Noel Streatfeild
The Secret Shoemakers, (1966), by James Reeves
A Likely Place, (1966), by Paula Fox
Daddy Long Legs, (1966), by Jean Webster
A Group of Apostles, (1966), by Paul Claudel
The Stuffed Dog, (1967), by John Symonds
Kali and the Golden Mirror, (1967) by Eva-Lis Wuorio
Nurse Matilda Goes to Town, (1967), by Christianna Brand
Robinson Crusoe, (1967), by Daniel Defoe
Miranda the Great, (1967), by Eleanor Estes
Rhyming Will, (1967), by James Reeves
Upsidedown Willie, (1967), by Dorothy Clewes
The Magic Summer, (1967), by Noel Streatfeild
Travels with a Donkey, (1967), by R. L. Stevenson
Special Branch Willie, (1968), by Dorothy Clewes
Do You Remember What Happened?, (1969), by Jean Chapman
The Angel and the Donkey, (1970), by James Reeves
Fire Brigade Willie, (1970), by Dorothy Clewes
The Tunnel of Hugsy Goode, (1972), by Eleanor Estes
The Little Fire Engine, (1973), by Graham Greene
The Little Horse Bus, (1974), by Graham Greene
A Child's Christmas in Wales, (1978), by Dylan Thomas

Awards and honours
1956 Kate Greenaway Medal, for Tim All Alone
1962 Elected Associate member of the Royal Academy of Arts
1970 Elected full member of the Royal Academy
1971 Appointed a Commander of the Order of the British Empire (CBE) in the 1971 New Year Honours
1974 Royal Designer for Industry
1975 Senior member of the Royal Academy

Notes

References

Further reading

Brian Alderson, 'Edward Ardizzone: a preliminary hand-list of his illustrated books, 1929–1970', in The Private Library; 2nd series, 5:1 (1972 Spring), pp. 2–64
Brian Alderson, Edward Ardizzone: A Bibliographic Commentary (2003. Private Libraries Association) )
Gabriel White, Edward Ardizzone Artist and Illustrator (1979)
Malcolm Yorke, To War with Paper and Brush: Captain Edward Ardizzone, official War Artist (2007. Fleece Press, Upper Denby Huddersfield)
Edward Ardizzone, 'Brian Robb', in Signature; new series, 11 (1950), pp. 37–45
Edward Ardizzone, 'On the illustrating of books', in The PLA Quarterly; 1st series, 1/3 (1957 July), pp. 25–30
Edward Ardizzone, 'The Born Illustrator', in Motif; 1 (1958 November), pp. 37–44 (reprinted in Folio (1962 January–March), pp. 1–16)
Richard Knott, 'The Sketchbook War', The History Press, 2013.
Justin Wintle and Emma Fisher, 'Edward Ardizzone', in The Pied Pipers: Interviews with the influential creators of children's literature, (1975. Paddington Press, London) pp. 35–48

External links

 

Works by Ardizzone in the Imperial War Museum collection.
 Cover of the 1937 Christmas edition of the Radio Times, signed "Ardizzone"
 Cover of the 1948 Christmas edition of the Radio Times, signed "DIZ"

1900 births
1979 deaths

20th-century English male artists
20th-century English male writers
20th-century English painters
Academics of Camberwell College of Arts
Academics of the Royal College of Art
Artists from Ipswich
British Army personnel of World War II
British children's book illustrators
British children's writers
British illustrators
British people of Algerian descent
British people of Italian descent
British people of French descent
British printmakers
British war artists
Commanders of the Order of the British Empire
Kate Greenaway Medal winners
People educated at Clayesmore School
People educated at Ipswich School
People from Haiphong
People from Maida Vale
Royal Academicians
World War II artists
Writers who illustrated their own writing